"The Apportionment of Human Diversity" is a 1972 paper on racial categorisation by American evolutionary biologist Richard Lewontin. In it, Lewontin presented an analysis of genetic diversity amongst people from different conventionally-defined races. His main finding, that there is more genetic variation within these populations than between them, is considered a landmark in the study of human genetic variation and contributed to the abandonment of race as a scientific concept.

Background 
By the 1960s, anthropologists such as Frank B. Livingstone had concluded that "there are no races, there are only clines" – smooth gradients of genetic variation in a species across its geographic range. Lewontin's mentor Theodosius Dobzhansky challenged this, arguing that there are human discrete populations that can be distinguished by differences in the frequency of genetic traits, which he called races. At that time the debate was largely semantic, stemming from their different ideas about what race is and how it would be manifested in humans genetics. The evidence that was available to Livingstone and Dobzhansky was mostly limited to qualitative observations of phenotypes thought to express genetic variation (e.g. skin colour). This changed over the course of the 1960s, as new techniques began to produce direct evidence for genetic variation in humans at a molecular level. By 1972, when Dobzhansky invited Lewontin to contribute to his edited volume of Evolutionary Biology, Lewontin felt that there was sufficient data to look at the problem anew, from a "firm quantitative basis":

Lewontin had been interested in using quantitative methods to assess taxonomic categories for some time before 1972. Over a decade earlier, palaeontologist George Gaylord Simpson had invited him to co-author a second edition of his textbook Quantitative Zoology (1960), and Lewontin added a chapter on the analysis of variance. In it, he illustrated how this approach could be used distinguish geographically distinct races with the example of Drosophila persimilis, a species of fruit fly. Though the method was similar to that he would later apply to human genetic variation, he reached the opposite conclusion: there was much greater genetic variance between geographic populations than between individual fruit flies, so there was a reasonable basis for distinguishing taxonomic races. Foreshadowing his later work on human genetic variation, he also emphasised that, because there will always be measurable differences between any two populations, it is the degree of difference compared to other axes of variation that will determine whether a grouping is biologically significant. "The Apportionment of Human Diversity" was published in an volume dedicated to Simpson, perhaps prompting Lewontin to recall this previous work.

Findings 
Lewontin performed a statistical analysis of the fixation index (FST) in populations drawn from seven classically-defined "races" (Caucasian, African, Mongoloid, South Asian Aborigines, Amerinds, Oceanians, and Australian Aborigines). At that time, direct sequence data from the human genome was not sufficiently available, so he instead used 17 indirect markers, including blood group proteins. Lewontin found that the majority of the total genetic variation between humans (i.e., of the 0.1% of DNA that varies between individuals), 85.4%, is found within populations, 8.3% of the variation is found between populations within a "race", and only 6.3% was found to account for the racial classification. Numerous later studies have confirmed his findings. Based on this analysis, Lewontin concluded, "Since such racial classification is now seen to be of virtually no genetic or taxonomic significance either, no justification can be offered for its continuance."

Legacy 
Many subsequent studies confirmed Lewontin's main finding.

The paper was not frequently cited in the years following its publication.

Fifty years after its publication, the paper was found to be frequently referenced in social media. In particular, Twitter users associated with far-right politics commonly used the term "Lewontin's fallacy" (referencing A. W. F. Edwards' 2003 critique of Lewontin, "Human Genetic Diversity: Lewontin's Fallacy") as a rhetorical device to dismiss scientific arguments against biological race. Commenting on the enduring significance afforded to Lewontin's paper in far-right and white nationalist discourse, geneticists Jedidiah Carlson and Kelley Harris proposed that "rejection of Lewontin's interpretation has become a tenet of white nationalist ideology".

In 2022, a special issue of the journal Philosophical Transactions of the Royal Society B: Biological Sciences was published with the theme "Celebrating 50 years since Lewontin's apportionment of human diversity", and a section of the book Remapping Race in a Global Context was devoted to discussing Lewontin's paper and defending it against Edwards' critique.

References

Biology papers
Human population genetics
Race (human categorization)
Biology controversies
Taxonomy (biology)